, , or  are wooden wands, decorated with two   (zigzagging paper streamers) used in Shinto rituals.

The streamers are usually white, although they can also be gold, silver, jade, or a mixture of several colors, and are often attached as decorations to straw ropes used to mark sacred precincts.

The  is used for some ceremonies, but its usual purpose is to cleanse a sacred place in temples and to cleanse, bless, or exorcise any object that is thought to have negative energy.

See also 
 Flail
 Glossary of Shinto for an explanation of terms concerning Japanese Shinto, Shinto art, and Shinto shrine architecture.
 , wooden wands used in Ainu rituals
 
 Ruyi (scepter)

References
 
 
 

Shinto in Japan
Exorcism in Shinto
Shinto religious objects
Wands
Ritual weapons
Honorary weapons
Ceremonial weapons